Ciaron Maher (born 27 May 1981) is an Australian, Melbourne Cup winning,  horse trainer. He grew up on his parent's dairy farm situated at Winslow, a town near Warrnambool, where he spent time around horses from a young age. For a few years, Maher rode as a jockey until the age of 23 when he was forced to quit riding due to his growing weight.

Suspension from racing 

From the 9 October 2017, Maher was suspended from racing for 6 months and fined $75,000 after pleading guilty to "conduct prejudicial to the image, interests or welfare of racing". Racing stewards alleged that Maher failed to report suspicions he had regarding conman Peter Foster's ownership of horses Azkadellia, Hart, Loveable Rogue and Mr Simples.

Group 1 winners 
Maher has achieved 30 group one wins which include:

 A J Moir Stakes - Coolangatta (2022)
 Australian Derby - Explosive Jack (2021); Hitotsu (2022)
 Australian Guineas - Hitotsu (2022)
 Caulfield Cup - Jameka (2016)
 Coolmore Classic - Lighthouse (2022)
 Doomben Cup - Kenedna (2019)
 H E Tancred Stakes - Sir Dragonet (2021)
 Memsie Stakes - Snapdancer (2022)
 Manikato Stakes - Loving Gaby (2019); Bella Nipotina (2022)
 Melbourne Cup - Gold Trip (2022)
 Oakleigh Plate - Marabi (2022)
 Queen of the Turf Stakes - Kenedna (2019)
 Robert Sangster Stakes - Snapdancer (2022)
 South Australian Derby - Explosive Jack (2021)
 Sydney Cup - Etah James (2020)
 Turnbull Stakes - Smokin' Romans (2022)
 Victoria Derby - Hitotsu (2021)
 W. S. Cox Plate - Sir Dragonet (2020)
 William Reid Stakes - Loving Gaby (2020)

Notes

Reference list 

1981 births
Australian racehorse trainers
Australian racehorse owners and breeders
Living people
People from Warrnambool